Lady Elizabeth Georgiana Shakerley  (née Anson; 7 June 1941 – 1 November 2020) was a British party planner and socialite from the Anson family. She was a first cousin once removed of Queen Elizabeth II and sister of Patrick Anson, 5th Earl of Lichfield.

Early life

The Honourable Elizabeth Georgiana Anson was born on 7 June 1941 at Windsor Castle to Thomas Anson, Viscount Anson (1913–1958), and Anne Bowes-Lyon. Anson's mother was a niece of Queen Elizabeth (later the Queen Mother). King George VI was her godfather. She was the niece of Nerissa and Katherine Bowes-Lyon. 

She was educated at Downham School, Essex. In 1960, her paternal grandfather, the 4th Earl of Lichfield, died and her brother, Patrick, inherited the title and family seat, Shugborough Hall near Great Haywood, Staffordshire. Despite the estate's passing to the National Trust in lieu of death duties, Lord Lichfield maintained an apartment for himself and his sister. 

Her parents divorced in 1948. Subsequently, her mother married Prince Georg of Denmark and moved to Paris where Prince George Valdemar served as military, naval and air attaché. Her father died in 1958 before acceding to the Earldom of  Lichfield. On 12 July 1961, Queen Elizabeth II issued a Royal Warrant of Precedence granting Anson the title, rank, place, pre-eminence and precedence of the daughter of an Earl as if her father had succeeded. Thus, she became known as Lady Elizabeth Anson. 

In 1966, Lady Elizabeth was a bridesmaid at the wedding of Princess Beatrix of the Netherlands and Claus van Amsberg.

Career
Following the stress of planning her own debutante ball in 1959, Lady Elizabeth founded the firm Party Planners in 1960. From then on she planned parties for her cousin, Queen Elizabeth II. Notable events she planned are: Sting's wedding, Margaret Thatcher's 70th birthday party, the Queen's 80th and 90th birthday parties, the wedding of Pavlos, Crown Prince of Greece, and Marie-Chantal Miller and a reception for foreign royal guests the night before the wedding of Prince William and Catherine Middleton. In 2000, she planned three consecutive events for the Royal Family; Prince William's 18th birthday on 21 June, Princess Anne’s 50th birthday on 15 August and Princess Margaret’s 70th birthday on 21 August. In 1993, she notably organised a 50th birthday party for Ivana Trump's then fiancé, Riccardo Mazzucelli, but later sued Trump for not receiving £6,500 of a £36,500 dinner bill. The courts eventually ruled in favour of Trump.

As the step-daughter of a Danish prince, Lady Elizabeth also attended many royal events in continental Europe, including the 80th birthday celebrations in Oslo of the King and Queen of Norway, and the funeral of Grand Duke Jean of Luxembourg. In 2018, Lady Elizabeth attended a state banquet given by Queen Elizabeth II in honour of the King and Queen of the Netherlands at Buckingham Palace.

Marriage and family
On 27 July 1972, Anson married Sir Geoffrey Shakerley, 6th Bt, at Westminster Abbey. Guests at the wedding included; Queen Elizabeth II, Queen Elizabeth The Queen Mother and Princess Beatrix of the Netherlands. Princess Anne and Lady Sarah Armstrong-Jones were among her bridesmaids. Lady Elizabeth and Shakerley separated in 1986 and divorced in 2009. They had one daughter and two grandchildren:
 Fiona Elizabeth Fenella Shakerley (born 18 August 1973); she married at Lichfield Cathedral on 22 May 2004, Edward Brocas Burrows (born 1975), grandson of Montagu Brocas Burrows. They have two children:
 Noah Burrows (born 1 March 2006)
 Ruby Burrows (born 2 November 2008)

Death
Shakerley suffered from chronic fatigue syndrome. She died of emphysema  in hospital in London on 1 November 2020 at the age of 79. A memorial service was held on 23 June 2022 at St Margaret's Church, Westminster. The Countess of Wessex (representing Queen Elizabeth II), Princess Beatrix of the Netherlands and Sheikh Hamad bin Khalifa Al Thani of Qatar attended, she was eulogized by Dame Joanna Lumley.

Honours
  31 March 2020: Commander of the Royal Victorian Order (CVO)
  10 March 1966: Recipient of the Wedding Medal of Princess Beatrix and Claus van Amsberg

Ancestry

Notes

References

1941 births
2020 deaths
People from Windsor, Berkshire
Daughters of viscounts
Wives of baronets
English socialites
Deaths from emphysema
Deaths from cancer in England
Commanders of the Royal Victorian Order
Elizabeth